Rubislaw is an area of Aberdeen, Scotland. It is located in the area between Queen's Road and King’s Gate, including Rubislaw Den North and South. It is close to Rubislaw Quarry and the Rubislaw Playing Fields used by Aberdeen Grammar School.
The buildings of the area are primarily Victorian or 1930s.

Attractions

Gordon Highlanders Museum
Johnston Gardens

Notable residents

Prof Robert Douglas Lockhart FRSE LLD (1894-1987) Professor of Anatomy at Aberdeen University.
Prof Marcus Sachs (1812-1869) Professor of Hebrew at Aberdeen University

References

Areas of Aberdeen